Acacia Research Corporation is an American company based in New York City. Acacia partners with patent owners such as inventors and universities to license patents that are infringed. Roughly 95% of the company's business involves licensing infringed patents on behalf of patent owners to corporations through patent litigation.

Acacia was incorporated in California in 1993 and is based in New York City. The company was consisted of two divisions: Acacia Technologies and CombiMatrix Group. The former covers the development, acquisition, licensing and enforcement of patented technologies. It creates a subsidiary company that acts as a special purpose entity for each set of patents that it enforces. The patent owner assigns the infringed patents to the subsidiary and the subsidiary then licenses the patents to companies who are infringing. Acacia and the patent owner split any revenues generated from licensing the patents on a 50/50 basis. Acacia's second division, CombiMatrix, constituted its life sciences business. This division, which Acacia held from 2002 until 2007, operated as a subsidiary. Invitae acquired CombiMatrix in 2017. 

Since the year 2000, Acacia has generated $1.4 billion in revenue from licensing patents and has paid out more than $731 million to inventors and other patent owners. The company has formed 233 known subsidiaries and has litigated 1,412 cases, four of which were not through a subsidiary.

References

External links
 
 Acacia Technologies, a subsidiary

Companies based in New York City
Patent monetization companies of the United States
Business services companies established in 1993
Companies listed on the Nasdaq
1993 establishments in California
American companies established in 1993